Khalifa Khamis (born 21 April 1966) is a Bahraini fencer. He competed in the team épée event at the 1988 Summer Olympics.

References

1966 births
Living people
Bahraini male épée fencers
Olympic fencers of Bahrain
Fencers at the 1988 Summer Olympics
Modern pentathletes at the 2002 Asian Games
Asian Games competitors for Bahrain